The Great Bridge of Hrazdan, more commonly known as Kievian Bridge, is an arch bridge for traffic linking across the Hrazdan River in Yerevan, Armenia. It connects the Kievian street of Arabkir district with the Leningradian street of Ajapnyak District. It was designed by architect Grigor Aghababyan and constructed between 1949 and 1956. 

The Karen Demirchyan Complex and the Tumanyan Park are located around the bridge.

References

Bridges in Yerevan
Bridges completed in 1956
Road bridges in Armenia